Laurie Ellen David (née Lennard; born March 22, 1958) is an American environmental activist, producer, and writer. She produced the Academy Award-winning An Inconvenient Truth (2006) and partnered with Katie Couric to executive produce Fed Up (2014), a film about the causes of obesity in the United States.  She serves as a trustee on the Natural Resources Defense Council and a member of the Advisory Board of the Children's Nature Institute and is a contributing blogger to The Huffington Post.

Personal life
Laurie Ellen Lennard was born and raised in a middle class Jewish family on Long Island. She was married for 14 years to Larry David from March 31, 1993 to July 13, 2007. They have two daughters.

In 2007, David was awarded nearly half of the net worth of her husband Larry, following their divorce. She remarried in 2012 to Robert Thorpe.

Entertainment industry

Before working full-time on environmental and political issues, David worked in the entertainment industry. She began her career in New York City as a talent coordinator for Late Night with David Letterman. Four years later, she left to start her own management company, representing comedians and comedy writers.

David also produced several comedy specials for HBO, Showtime, MTV, and Fox Television. Upon moving to Los Angeles, she became vice president of comedy development for a division of Fox Broadcasting and developed sitcoms for 20th Century Fox Television. After leaving to raise her two daughters, she executive produced An Inconvenient Truth, which won an Academy Award. 

David wrote two popular cookbooks on healthy eating and the importance of family dinner, The Family Dinner, and The Family Cooks. She co-wrote The Down To Earth Guide To Global Warming. Most recently she co-wrote Imagine It! A Handbook for a Happier Planet published by RandomHouse Rodale.

Activism

Climate Change
Laurie David has worked publicly on projects aimed at stopping climate change. She founded the Stop Global Warming Virtual March with Senator John McCain and Robert F. Kennedy, Jr. David has produced other projects to bring the issue of climate change into the mainstream popular culture, including the release of her first book, Stop Global Warming: The Solution Is You!, and the comedy special, Earth to America! for TBS, which aired on November 20, 2005. 

Aside from the Academy Award-winning documentary An Inconvenient Truth, David produced HBO's Too Hot Not to Handle (a documentary on the effects of climate change in the United States), which aired on April 22, 2006. David appeared in Big Ideas for a Small Planet, an environmentalist documentary series on the Sundance Channel.

In an interview with The Guardian in November 2006, David admitted that owning two homes on opposite sides of the country and flying in a private jet several times per year is at odds with her message to others. In the interview, she notes "Yes, I take a private plane on holiday a couple of times a year, and I feel horribly guilty about it. I probably shouldn't do it. But the truth is, I'm not perfect. This is not about perfection. I don't expect anybody else to be perfect either. That's what hurts the environmental movement – holding people to a standard they cannot meet. That just pushes people away."

In 2005, and then again in 2009, David was cited by the Chilmark Conservation Commission for paving over protected wetland areas on her estate on Martha's Vineyard.

Campaigns
As a trustee of the Natural Resources Defense Council and a founding member of The Detroit Project, David has spearheaded numerous public education and action campaigns urging Congress and auto-makers to raise fuel efficiency standards and make higher mileage cars. In January 2004, the NRDC opened the David Family Environmental Action Center.

Awards

In 2003, she was honored by the Riverkeeper organization. She also received the Los Angeles-based Children's Nature Institute's Leaf Award in 2003 for her commitment to the environmental education of young children.

In October 2006, David was featured in Glamour as one of its "Women of the Year". She received the Gracie Allen Award for Individual Achievement by the American Women in Radio & Television and the NRDC's 2006 Forces for Nature award for her work against global warming. 

Laurie has received numerous other awards and honors, including the Producers Guild of America’s Stanley Kramer Award, a Humanitas Prize Special Award.  Her environmental work has been honored with the National Audubon Society’s Rachel Carson Award, the Feminist Majority’s Eleanor Roosevelt Award, and Bette Midler’s Green Goddess Award in 2019.

Books

David's book The Family Dinner was published in 2010, with recipes by Kirstin Uhrenholdt, a foreword by Harvey Karp and an afterword by Jonathan Safran Foer. The book advocates a return to the domestic tradition of an evening meal (sometimes called supper) shared around the family table.

Her second cookbook The Family Cooks was published a few years later. She co-wrote a book on climate for kids called The Down to Earth Guide to Global Warming. In 2021, she co-wrote Imagine It! A Handbook for a Happier Planet published by Random House/Rodale.

Bibliography

References

External links
Laurie David Official website

Laurie David interview by Grist Magazine[link dead]
Huffington Post column
Laurie David talks with Chicago Life about her work with The Inconvenient Truth.

1958 births
American bloggers
American environmentalists
American women environmentalists
American non-fiction environmental writers
American talent agents
American television writers
Businesspeople from Los Angeles
People from Long Island
Environmental bloggers
Jewish American writers
Living people
Ohio University alumni
Television producers from New York City
HuffPost writers and columnists
Writers from Los Angeles
Activists from California
Activists from New York (state)
Writers from New York City
Screenwriters from New York (state)
Screenwriters from California
Television producers from California
American women television producers
American women television writers
American women columnists
21st-century American women